Hannah and Her Brothers, written and directed by Vladimír Adásek, is the first feature-length film from Slovakia to deal with homosexuality. The film premiered in December 2000 at the International Film Festival Bratislava and had its theatrical release in January 2001.

Premise
In the local cabaret "Hannah and Her Brothers", Hana relates the story of the main character, Martin, and his journey of self-discovery through the songs of the Slovak chanteuse Hana Hegerová.  The music and lyrics play an important role illustrating and commenting on the action.

Cast

Awards
 2000 International Film Festival Bratislava – Grand Prix Nomination (Vladimír Adásek)

See also
 Hana Hegerová discography

References

External links

 
 Hana a jej bratia at the Slovak Film Database (in Slovak)
 Hannah and Her Brothers at International Film Festival Bratislava (in English)

2001 films
2001 in Slovakia
Slovak-language films
Slovak LGBT-related films